Michael Trulsen (born 28 December 1989) is a Norwegian footballer who plays as a forward for Lisleby.

He started his senior career in Fredrikstad, appearing eight times in the Norwegian Premier League of 2008 and 2009. In 2010, he went on to neighbors Sarpsborg 08, who won promotion, and in 2011 he played seven first-tier games for them. He joined Nybergsund in mid-season.

After the 2011 season he joined Østsiden IL in his hometown, but retired already in August 2012. He later made a comeback for lower-tier Lisleby.

References

1989 births
Living people
Sportspeople from Fredrikstad
Norwegian footballers
Fredrikstad FK players
Sarpsborg 08 FF players
Nybergsund IL players
Eliteserien players
Norwegian First Division players
Østsiden IL players
Lisleby FK players

Association football forwards